Anthony Ferraro Louis Barber  (born 28 March 1940) is a British Australian Gold Logie award-winning television game show host, radio announcer singer and media personality, who has been active in the industry since the early 1960s.

Biography

Early life and radio career
Barber was born in Oldham, Lancashire, England in March 1940. He has said that he "owes much of his enthusiastic and driving personality to a loving Irish grandma and a whole street full of aunts who kept the spirits high during the dark years of World War II." He moved with his family to Australia in 1947 and was educated by the Sisters of Mercy and the Irish Christian Brothers.

He attended Britannia Royal Naval College in Dartmouth, graduating in 1960.  Moving to Australia, he began his media career as a cadet announcer at radio station 6GE in Geraldton, Western Australia in 1961. In his own words:"The Sisters of so-called Mercy taught me to sing & dance, the brothers taught me to bob & weave. The navy taught me to play rugby."

Singing

By the end of 1962, Barber was a leading Perth radio announcer as well as the star of a weekly floor show at the Charles Hotel and another twice-weekly event at the Lido Coral Room where he performed impressions of Johnny Mathis and Paul Anka. Before leaving Western Australia for New South Wales he also appeared in a number of plays with the Scarborough players.

After moving to Sydney, Barber appeared at numerous hotel talent quests, a regular role as resident compere and vocalist at the Spellsons nitery in Pitt Street. This was in addition to holding down a regular job as an advertising executive, where at one point he cast himself as the "Cambridge Whistler", a central character in a 1960s cigarette commercial which brought him national recognition.

It was at this point that the then head of the Seven Network, Bruce Gyngell, spotted Barber and was understood to have liked what he saw and suggested that he host a Reg Grundy show.

Media career

While Barber is more noted for his role as host of Sale of the Century, his origins in television date back to the early 1970s when he hosted the then popular Seven Network game show The $25,000 Great Temptation. The show was successful enough for the network that both daytime and prime time editions of the show were screened.

The show only faltered when in 1974, Seven decided to move the show from its 7:00 pm timeslot to the later 8:30 pm timeslot in an effort to attract viewers away from the then popular series Number 96 screening on the 0-10 Networks. Number 96 won the ratings battle and The $25,000 Great Temptation aired its last show in 1975. Barber then hosted the Australian version of Family Feud on the Nine Network from 1977 until 1979.

In 1980, the Grundy Organization, on the advice of its founder and producer, Reg Grundy, decided to revive the $25,000 Great Temptation format using the original international title, Sale of the Century. Screened nationally on the Nine Network, Barber hosted the show from 1980–91. His hostesses during his time were Victoria Nicolls (1980–82), Delvene Delaney (1982–85) and Alyce Platt (1986–91). Barber left the show in 1991 after being offered a 12-month contract renewal instead of the usual three-year deal; Platt left at the same time. Host Glenn Ridge and co-host Jo Bailey replaced them.

In 1993, Barber went on to host the short-lived Australian version of Jeopardy! (Network Ten). It has been said that its failure was partly due to placing it in the 6:00 pm timeslot against high-rating news bulletins of the day. Barber later stated in an interview that Jeopardy! Was his favorite of all the game shows he hosted in his career.  After Jeopardy, Barber succeeded John Burgess as host of Wheel of Fortune (Seven Network) in July 1996 following the show's relocation from Adelaide to Sydney as part of an attempted revamp.

As part of an attempt to win viewers back, the theme music that had been introduced the previous year was reinstated, the new set underwent minor changes and the former prize shop was reincarnated to an extent - contestants upon solving a puzzle were offered three prizes and one had to be selected. By the end of 1996, these changes together with the loss of the familiar Burgess resulted in poor viewing figures, and Barber decided to leave the show. Barber appeared at the beginning of the 1997 series premiere to hand the show over to Rob Elliott. During his time on TV, Barber estimates that he has hosted over 8,500 individual episodes of successful Grundy games.

Recently he hosted a small competition on the Australian Cable TV network Foxtel seven nights a week called TV1's Cash Trivia Challenge. On 14 March 2007, he returned to his roots making an appearance as guest host on Temptation, alongside his former co-host Alyce Platt, during the Battle of the Network Shows series, where the original hosts, Ed Phillips and Livinia Nixon appeared as contestants.

In August 2013, Barber was announced as a contestant on the upcoming series of Dancing with the Stars.

Honours

In June 1991 Barber received the Medal of the Order of Australia award "In recognition of service to the entertainment industry."

Awards
In 1973, Barber won the TV Week Gold Logie Award for Most Popular Personality on Australian Television.

Discography

Studio albums

Compilation albums

References

External links
 Profile, mediaman.com.au; accessed 18 December 2016.
 Profile, imdb.com; accessed 3 September 2017.

Further reading
Barber, Tony (2001). Who am I?, Random House; 

1940 births
Living people
Australian male singers
Australian people of Irish descent
Australian game show hosts
English emigrants to Australia
English people of Irish descent
Gold Logie winners
People from Oldham
Recipients of the Medal of the Order of Australia